Enver Balkan (5 March 1902 – 1966) was a Turkish fencer. He competed in the individual and team sabre events at the 1928 and 1936 Summer Olympics.

References

External links
 

1902 births
1966 deaths
Turkish male sabre fencers
Olympic fencers of Turkey
Fencers at the 1928 Summer Olympics
Fencers at the 1936 Summer Olympics